Daniel Levy (born March 19, 1981) is an American comedian, actor, writer, and producer based in Los Angeles. He began performing stand-up in the 2000s and has released three comedy albums, including his most recent special Dan Levy: Lion in 2016. He has written for a number of television comedies including Whitney (2011–2013) and was a producer of The Awesomes (2013–15), Mulaney (2014–15), and The Goldbergs (2014–15). In 2020, he created the NBC series Indebted.

Early life 
Levy was born on March 19, 1981, to Linda and Elliott L. Levy. In 1993, Levy was a member of the "Half Pint Players", a teenage improvization group in Stamford, Connecticut.  He began performing as a comedian while attending Emerson College in Boston.

Career 
Levy has performed at the Montreal Just For Laughs Comedy Festival, New York Comedy Festival, SF Sketchfest, and toured with Aziz Ansari, John Mulaney, and Whitney Cummings. He has made TV appearances on Premium Blend, Comedy Central Presents, The Late Late Show with Craig Kilborn, Late Night with Seth Meyers, Chelsea Lately, The Office, Enlightened, Atypical, and @midnight. His Comedy Central album Congrats on Your Success debuted #1 on iTunes when it was released in 2012. His hour-long comedy special Dan Levy: LION first premiered on Seeso.

As a host, Levy has worked on four MTV shows including Your Face Or Mine and MTV Spring Break, and his own talk show for College Humor: IHaveToGoInAMinuteShow, a daily comedy show directed by Todd Strauss-Schulson. Levy produced, wrote, and starred in My Long Distance Relationship, a 10-part web series for Crackle.

In April 2013, Levy collaborated with DJ Jensen Karp to create Baby Talk, a live comedy show where three to four comedians ask for parenting advice from children between the ages of 5 and 10 years old.  The show was held at NerdMelt Showroom in Los Angeles, which later became a JASH series. Some of the guests included Blake Griffin, Paul Scheer, Natasha Leggero, Bo Burnham, Neal Brennan, and Jermaine Fowler.

In Fall 2016, Levy released his first hour-long comedy special, Dan Levy: LION, on the NBC streaming platform Seeso and Amazon.

Levy executive produced Pretty Wild for E!, and the VH1 sketch series Stevie TV. Levy has written for the Roast of Justin Bieber, and the sitcoms Whitney, Mulaney, The Awesomes, and seasons 2–5 of The Goldbergs, working his way up to Executive Producer. In 2020 Levy created the series Indebted for NBC, starring Fran Drescher, Steven Weber, Adam Pally, Abby Elliott, and Jessy Hodges. Since January 2021, he has been the host of the discovery+ original series House Hunters: Comedians on Couches.

Personal life 
Levy married television writer Rachel Specter in 2010. He is close friends with comedian John Mulaney.

Filmography

Films

Television

Discography 
Congrats On Your Success (2011)
Running out of Minutes (2013)
Dan Levy: LION (2016)

References

External links 

1981 births
20th-century American comedians
21st-century American comedians
21st-century American male actors
American comedy writers
American male television actors
American stand-up comedians
Emerson College alumni
Jewish American male actors
Jewish American comedy writers
Jewish American comedians
Living people
Male actors from Stamford, Connecticut
Writers from Stamford, Connecticut
21st-century American Jews